State Route 167 (SR 167) is a state highway in Johnson County, Tennessee and a spur route of Tennessee State Route 67.

Route description
SR 167 begins at an intersection with SR 67 in Doeville. It goes southeastward as Doe Creek Road and passes through a gap between two ridges before turning south and coming to an intersection with Lakeview Drive, where the highway skirts along  the banks of Watauga Lake for a short distance. SR 167 then turns left to go northeast as Roan Creek Road and passes through some farmland before crisscrossing through some mountains. The highway then re-enters farmland and travels northeastward past Johnson County Airport. SR 167 then enters Mountain City and passes by a neighborhood before having an intersection with US 421/SR 67 (S Shady Street). SR 167 then leaves Mountain City soon after as Forge Creek Road and continues in a northeastward direction and crisscrosses through various valley and ridges for several miles before coming to its northern terminus at the North Carolina state line, where it continues as Big Laurel Road towards Fig and North Carolina Highway 88.

Junction list

References

167
Transportation in Johnson County, Tennessee